CTCA may refer to:

Cancer Treatment Centers of America
Chinese Taipei Chess Association
Commission on Training Camp Activities
Computed tomography coronary angiography (Cardiac CT scan)
Channel-to-channel adapter, a device for connecting two computer systems